Daniel Kalles Pettersson is a Swedish football manager.

Coaching career
Kalles Pettersson took over Damallsvenskan team Hammarby IF DFF for the 2009 season. In August 2009, he was sacked from Hammarby IF DFF. During the 2010 season, he managed  Djurgården's women's team.

References

Swedish football managers
Hammarby Fotboll (women) managers
Djurgårdens IF Fotboll (women) managers
Year of birth missing (living people)
Place of birth missing (living people)
Living people
Damallsvenskan managers